Kincardine Castle is a 19th-century manor house near Auchterarder in Perth and Kinross, Scotland. The Gothic house was constructed in 1801–1803, and is a category B listed building.

The remains of an earlier 14th century keep, also named Kincardine Castle, are located nearby. The ruined keep was demolished in 1645. Little remains today beyond its rectangular foundations.

References

Castles in Perth and Kinross
Category B listed buildings in Perth and Kinross
Category B listed houses in Scotland